The following is a complete list of matches played by OFK Beograd in European competition based outside the territories of SFR Yugoslavia, FR Yugoslavia, and Serbia.

Before UEFA 
 Competed in five seasons
 1927
MC QF: MTK Hungária  4 – 2 BSK | BSK 0 – 4 MTK Hungária | (Agg: 2 – 8)

 1928
MC QF: BSK 0 – 7 Ferencváros  | Ferencváros 6 – 1 BSK | (Agg: 1 – 13)

 1938
MC R1: BSK 2 – 3 Slavia Prague  | Slavia Prague 2 – 1 BSK | (Agg: 3 – 5)

 1939
MC QF: BSK 3 – 0 Slavia Prague  | Slavia Prague 2 – 1 BSK | (Agg: 4 – 2)

MC SF: BSK 4 – 2 Újpest  | Újpest 7 – 1 BSK | (Agg: 5 – 9)

 1940
MC QF: BSK 3 – 0 Venus București  | Venus București 0 – 1 BSK | (Agg: 4 – 0)

MC SF: BSK 1 – 0 Ferencváros  | Ferencváros 2 – 0 BSK | (Agg: 1 – 2)

UEFA competitions 
 Qualified for Europe in 14 seasons (2 in European Cup Winners' Cup, 9 in Europa League/UEFA Cup/Inter-Cities Fairs Cup, 3 in Intertoto Cup)

Europe
Serbian football clubs in international competitions
Yugoslav football clubs in international competitions